Matthew Bronfman (born July 16, 1959) is an American businessman, entrepreneur and philanthropist. A member of the Bronfman family, he is the son of prominent businessman and philanthropist Edgar Bronfman, Sr.

Biography
Bronfman is one of seven children, one of five from Ann (Loeb) and Edgar Miles Bronfman. His mother was the daughter of John Langeloth Loeb Sr. (a Wall Street investment banker whose company was a predecessor of Shearson Lehman/American Express) and Frances Lehman (a member of the Lehman family that founded the Lehman Brothers banking firm). They divorced in 1973.

Bronfman attended the Cardigan Mountain School, the Taft School, and graduated from Williams College in 1981. After working at Goldman Sachs he attended Harvard Business School, where he graduated in 1985. Bronfman began his career at Goldman Sachs and the Cadillac Fairview Corporation.

As one of the largest American Jewish investors in the Israeli economy, Bronfman is also the main shareholder in IKEA Israel, Israel Discount Bank and the Shufersal supermarket chain. He is also the chairman and CEO of BHB holdings, a family holding company. Previously, He was a managing director at ACI Holdings, a private equity firm based in New York.

He is a former director of Jenny Craig, BizBash Media Inc., Palace Candles, Inc., EARNEST Partners, LLC, Tweeter Home Entertainment Group Inc., and James River Group, Inc.

Philanthropy
Bronfman is the chairman of the international steering committee of Limmud FSU, a program focused on strengthening the Jewish identities of Russian-speaking Jews, and the chairman of the American Jewish Committee’s ACCESS, which trains Jewish professionals to shape public opinion and policy around the world. He is also the managing principal of the Treetops Foundation, a charity focused on Jewish philanthropy and is on the boards of 92nd Street Y and the Canadian Centre for Architecture.

Personal life
Bronfman has been married four times. His first wife was Fiona Woods; they divorced in June 1997. They had three children: Gabriela Talia Bronfman, Eli Miles Bronfman, and Jeremy Samuel Bronfman. 

In December 1997, he married Lisa Belzberg, daughter of Canadian businessman Samuel Belzberg, with whom he has three children, Sasha Eliana Bronfman, Tess Emanuella Bronfman and Ezekiel Belzberg Bronfman. 

In 2005, he married Stacey Kaye with whom he had one child, Coby Benjamin Bronfman; they divorced in 2016. 

In April 2017, he married Israeli Melanie Lavie with whom he had his eighth child, James Raphael Bronfman, and his ninth child, Stella Ann Bronfman. 

He currently resides in Manhattan. His sons Jeremy and Eli founded Lincoln Avenue Capital, a real estate investor and developer in affordable housing. His son, Zeke, is the cofounder and CEO of XED Beverages.

References

1959 births
Living people
American people of Russian-Jewish descent
Jewish American philanthropists
Harvard Business School alumni
Williams College alumni
Businesspeople from New York City
Lehman family
Philanthropists from New York (state)
Carl M. Loeb family